Sin rastro de ti is a Mexican telenovela produced by Silvia Cano for Televisa, based on an original story by Carlos Quintanilla Sakar and Adriana Pelusi. The series premiered on September 9, 2016, through the Televisa-owned Blim TV streaming platform.

The series stars Adriana Louvier as Julia, Danilo Carrera as Mauricio and Ana Layevska as Camila.

Plot 
The night before her wedding, Julia (Adriana Louvier), a young pediatrician with a bright future, disappears without a trace.

Five years later, in the middle of the road, a university student finds a woman dressed as a bride, alone and disoriented. The boy takes her to the nearest hospital. During the journey the woman reaches to say her name: Julia Borges.

Julia has no memory of what happened to her during these five years. She only has an image that she can not get out of her mind: a man she does not recognize and who promises to take care of her forever.

Mauricio (Danilo Carrera), Julia's fiancée, believing her dead, has moved on with his life. He is married and has a one year old son. His new wife: Camila (Ana Layevska), Julia's troublesome younger sister.

The only one who kept hoping to find Julia is Tomás (Juan Pablo Medina), her best friend and co-worker. Tomás has invested all his money, ruined his marriage and has been almost ruined by trying to discover her whereabouts. The reason? He's always been in love with her.

Julia tries to face this new reality, in which the man she loves is married to someone else and all her life projects collapsed. Meanwhile, looking for clues that reveal what happened to her during these lost years and who was responsible for her disappearance.

Cast

Primary 

 Adriana Louvier as Julia Borges / Lorena Mendoza
 Danilo Carrera as Mauricio Santillana
 Ana Layevska as Camila Borges

Secondary  
 José Elías Moreno as Raúl Santillana
 Roberto Blandón as Ángel
 Fernando Ciangherotti as Doctor Miller
 Tiaré Scanda as Doctora Arias
 José Pablo Minor as Luis Lara
 Juan Pablo Medina as Tomás
 Juan Martin Jáuregui as Braulio Portes
 Alejandra Ambrosi as Brigitte
 Pablo Perroni as Julián Reynoso
 Alejandra Robles Gil as Érika Santillana
 Gema Garoa as Galina
 Mauricio Abularach as Marco
 Lalo Palacios as Pedro

Episodes

Awards and nominations

References  

Las Estrellas original programming
2016 Mexican television series debuts
Spanish-language television shows
2016 Mexican television series endings
Blim TV original programming
Televisa telenovelas
2016 telenovelas